Yumenornis is an extinct genus of basal ornithuromorph dinosaur known from the Early Cretaceous Xiagou Formation of Changma Basin, Gansu Province of northwestern China. Yumenornis was first named by Ya-Ming Wang, Jingmai O'Connor, Da-Qing Li and Hai-Lu You in 2013 and the type species is Yumenornis huangi.

References

Prehistoric euornitheans
Bird genera
Early Cretaceous birds of Asia
Fossil taxa described in 2013
Paleontology in Gansu